The women's 100 metre breaststroke competition of the swimming event at the 2015 Southeast Asian Games was held on 8 June at the OCBC Aquatic Centre in Kallang, Singapore.

Records

Schedule
All times are Singapore Standard Time (UTC+08:00)

Results

Heats

The heats were held on 8 June.

Heat 1

Heat 1 was held on 8 June.

Heat 2

Heat 2 was held on 8 June.

Final

The final was held on 8 June.

References

External links
 

Women's 100 metre breaststroke
Women's sports competitions in Singapore
2015 in women's swimming